The BACK Tour (subtitled Old Songs, New Songs, F*** You Songs) was a concert tour by Australian musician Tim Minchin. The tour began on 5 March 2019 at the Thebarton Theatre in Adelaide before touring Australia, New Zealand, and the United Kingdom before concluding on 22 January 2022 at the Enmore Theatre, Sydney.

Background 
On 29 August 2018, it was announced that Tim Minchin would be making his first tour following his orchestra arena tour in 2010 and 2011 (with the exception of a micro tour of Los Angeles in 2017 called Leaving LA) promoted by Live Nation Entertainment in Australian and New Zealand in March and April 2019 and Phil McIntyre in the UK in October and November 2019.

The 2019 tour featured old songs from his previous musical comedy shows and songs from his stage musicals Matilda, Groundhog Day and his TV series Upright. It also featured new songs reflecting Minchin's past experiences, relationships, social and political views such as "If This Plane Goes Down", "Leaving LA", "I'll Take Lonely Tonight", "Carry You" and "Talked Too Much, Stayed Too Long" which also feature on Minchin's studio album Apart Together released in 2020.

Due to the popularity of the sold-out Australian and New Zealand tour, it was announced that Minchin would be touring again as an Encore tour in March 2020, however due to the COVID-19 pandemic dates had to be rescheduled to January and February 2021, then again to June and July 2021, with a couple of dates announced as part of the Adelaide Cabaret Festival. Also dates were announced for an Encore tour of the UK in October and November 2021. The 2021 dates feature most of the songs from the 2019/20 tour with more songs replaced with songs from the Apart Together album including "Airport Piano" and "The Absence of You".

During the tour, VIP tickets were sold raising the money to various charities in which $1.25million was raised.

Tour band 

 Tim Minchin; lead vocals, piano, guitar
 Jak Housden; guitar, BV's
 Sarah Belkner; keys, BV's, guiro, tambourine, melodica, keytar, guitar, piano, assistant MD
 Pete Clements; bass guitar (2019 UK tour)
 Brad Webb; drums (2019 UK tour)
 Tom Richards; alto saxophone, baritone saxophone, flute, dancer (2019 UK tour)
 Rory Simmons; trumpet, flugelhorn, piccolo trumpet, dancer (2019 UK tour)
 Emma Bassett; trombone (2019 UK tour)

Set list

"If This Plane Goes Down"
"F Sharp"
"Mitsubishi Colt"
"Thank You God"
"Airport Piano"
"15 Minutes"
"The Absence of You"
"If I Didn't Have You"
Interval
"Leaving LA"
"Cheese"
"I'll Take Lonely Tonight"
"Talked Too Much, Stayed Too Long"
Encore
"Carry You"

Tour dates

Filmed recording 
On 17 February 2022, Minchin revealed that the final UK shows at the Shepherd's Bush Empire, London were filmed and due to be released at a later date. On 11 October 2022, it was revealed that the recording would be shown in cinemas in the UK and Ireland on 23 November 2022.

References 

2019 concert tours
2020 concert tours
2021 concert tours
Concert tours postponed due to the COVID-19 pandemic
2022 concert tours